Predole is a small settlement in the Municipality of Grosuplje in central Slovenia. The area is part of the historical region of Lower Carniola. The municipality is now included in the Central Slovenia Statistical Region.

References

External links
Predole on Geopedia

Populated places in the Municipality of Grosuplje